Grand Ridge is a town in Jackson County, Florida, United States. The population was 892 at the 2010 census, up from 792 at the 2000 census.

Geography

Grand Ridge is located in southeastern Jackson County at  (30.711977, –85.018091). U.S. Route 90 travels through the northern side of the town, leading east  to Chattahoochee and northwest  to Marianna, the county seat. Florida State Road 69 runs through the center of town as Porter Avenue, leading north  to Two Egg and south  to Interstate 10 at Exit 152.

Demographics

2020 census

As of the 2020 United States census, there were 882 people, 386 households, and 263 families residing in the town.

2000 census
As of the census of 2000, there were 792 people, 309 households, and 232 families residing in the town. The racial makeup of the town was 93.56% White, 2.53% African American, 2.27% Native American, 0.13% Pacific Islander, 0.76% from other races, and 0.76% from two or more races. Hispanic or Latino of any race were 1.26% of the population.

There were 309 households, out of which 35.9% had children under the age of 18 living with them, 59.9% were married couples living together, 13.6% had a female householder with no husband present, and 24.6% were non-families. 22.0% of all households were made up of individuals, and 8.1% had someone living alone who was 65 years of age or older.  The average household size was 2.56 and the average family size was 2.95.

In the town, the population was spread out, with 26.3% under the age of 18, 7.6% from 18 to 24, 31.2% from 25 to 44, 23.5% from 45 to 64, and 11.5% who were 65 years of age or older.  The median age was 36 years. For every 100 females, there were 91.8 males.  For every 100 females age 18 and over, there were 85.4 males.

The median income for a household in the town was $31,083, and the median income for a family was $36,875. Males had a median income of $24,722 versus $20,125 for females. The per capita income for the town was $14,556.  About 9.6% of families and 16.5% of the population were below the poverty line, including 26.5% of those under age 18 and 11.2% of those age 65 or over.

References

Towns in Jackson County, Florida
Towns in Florida